The 2002 Campeonato Nacional Apertura Copa Banco del Estado was the 71st Chilean League top flight tournament. The champion was Universidad Católica which won its eight league title.

Qualifying round

Scores

Standings

Group A

Group B

Group C

Group D

Playoff stage

Finals

Top goalscorers

Pre-Copa Sudamericana 2002 Tournament

First round
Played on August 14 & 15, 2002

Second round
Played on August 20, 2002

Final round

Santiago Wanderers & Cobreloa qualified to 2002 Copa Sudamericana

External links
RSSSF Chile 2002

Primera División de Chile seasons
Chile
2002 in Chilean football